The 31st Golden Disc Awards ceremony was held on January 13–14, 2017. The JTBC network broadcast the show from the Korea International Exhibition Center (KINTEX) in Ilsan. Hwang Chi-yeul, Seohyun and Jung Yong-hwa served as hosts on the first day, with Kang So-ra and Sung Si-kyung on the second.

Criteria
Albums and songs released between November 1, 2015, and November 30, 2016, were eligible to be nominated for the 31st Golden Disc Awards. The winners of the digital music, album and rookie categories were determined by music sales (70%), a panel of music experts (20%) and online votes (10%). Music sales were based on data from Gaon Music Chart and were counted until December 31, 2016. The Popularity Award was based entirely on online votes.

Winners and nominees

Main awards
Winners and nominees are listed in alphabetical order. Winners are listed first and emphasized in bold.

Special awards

Gallery

References

2017 in South Korean music
2017 music awards
Golden Disc Awards ceremonies